Murmansk Finns (Fin: Kuolansuomalaiset , Muurmanninsuomalaiset) are a group of Finns living in Murmansk. They came to Murmansk around 1860 during the Finnish famine of 1866–68. However, there was another immigration period in 1900, due to the building of the Kirov Railway. In 2010 there were 273 Finns in living in Murmansk

Around the end of the Tsardom, there were about 40 villages or towns where Murmansk Finns lived.
in 1920 when Petsamo was given to Finland, many Murmansk Finns moved to Petsamo. However two thirds of Murmansk Finns stayed in Soviet Russia. 

During the Stalin era, the Murmansk Finns were heavily persecuted, nearly all Murmansk Finns died during Stalin's leadership. The last Murmansk Finnish villages were emptied near the end of 1930, when 6,973 Finns, Norwegians and Swedes were deported. Some were deported to Karelia and others beyond the Altai mountains. The population of Päiväjärvi was sent to Gulag, and 90% of the people died in there.

References

External links 
 Audio recording of the Finnish dialect in Pechengsky

Finnish people
Ethnic groups in Russia
Ethnic groups in Sápmi
European diaspora in Russia
Historical ethnic groups of Russia
History of Murmansk Oblast
History of the Arctic
Grand Duchy of Finland
Finland–Russia relations